Emblemaria hyltoni, the Filament blenny, is a species of chaenopsid blenny found around Belize and Honduras, in the western Atlantic ocean. It can reach a maximum length of  TL. The specific name honours Nick Hylton who acted as captain and crew of the yacht Miss Sabrina during the authors expedition to the Mosquito Coast in 1975.

References
 Johnson, R.K., and D.W. Greenfield, 1976 A new chaenopsid fish, Emblemaria hyltoni, from Isla Roatán, Honduras. Fieldiana Zoology v. 70 (no. 2): 13–28.

hyltoni
Fish described in 1976